HD 23319 (h Eridani) is an orange-hued star in the constellation Eridanus. It has an apparent visual magnitude of 4.59, which is sufficiently bright to make it visible to the naked eye. It is moving further away from the Earth with a heliocentric radial velocity of +9.9 km/s.

It is a red clump giant, indicating it is on the horizontal branch and is generating energy through helium fusion at its core. The star has 1.2 times the mass of the Sun and, at the age of 4.6 billion years, has expanded to 11 times the Sun's radius. It is radiating 63 times the Sun's luminosity from its enlarged photosphere at an effective temperature of 4,581 K.

References

K-type giants
Horizontal-branch stars
Eridanus (constellation)
Eridani, h
Durchmusterung objects
023319
017351
1143